Igor Rosokhovatski (1929-2015) was a Ukrainian writer.

Works (selected) 
 1990 — And Man Created Syhom

References 

Soviet male writers
20th-century Ukrainian writers
1929 births
2015 deaths
People from Smila
Ukrainian science fiction writers